A declaration of mailing is a legal form verifying that a document has been sent via mail to a third party, usually required to be sent with documents as proof to a judge or clerk that a set of documents has been mailed. This may be to an individual or group, or attorneys relating to a particular issue. It requires that legally once signed a document has been sent; and if broken the sending party may be liable to charges of perjury or contempt of court.

The document is usually a short form with the following indicated information:
 Business address or contact address; sometimes telephone and fax numbers.
 Name and signature of mailer.
 Names of documents attached.
 Names of parties or attorneys sent to.

See also 
 Declaration (disambiguation)

External links 
 Example declaration of mailing

Legal documents
Public law